Palmyrene Aramaic was a Western Aramaic dialect  spoken in the city of Palmyra, Syria, in the early centuries AD. It is solely known from inscriptions dating from the 1st century BC to 273.

The dual had disappeared from it.

The development of cursive versions of the Aramaic alphabet led to the creation of the Palmyrene alphabet.

See also
Western Neo-Aramaic
Palmyrene Empire

References

Further reading

Aramaic languages
Palmyrenean
Extinct languages of Asia
Palmyra